is a Japanese voice actress.

Filmography

Anime series
Aikatsu! as Lisa Hīragi/Green Grass
Avenger as Mist, Peter (ep 2)
Bakugan Battle Brawlers as Harpy, Miyoko Kūsō
Bakugan: Gundalian Invaders as Miyoko Kuso
Bakugan Battle Brawlers: New Vestroia as Miyoko Kuso
BanG Dream! 3rd Season as Miu Tamade
Bleach: Thousand-Year Blood War as Kirio Hikifune
Bokurano as Chizu's mother (ep 7)
Digimon Universe: Appli Monsters as Beautymon
Delicious Party Pretty Cure as Akiho Nagomi (ep 39 onwards)
Emma: A Victorian Romance as House maid (ep 11)
Fate/Zero as Maiya Hisau
Gakuen Heaven as Kazuki Endo (child)
Gargantia on the Verdurous Planet as Lukkage
Gin Tama as Female Clerk (Ep. 23), Juttoku's Daughter (Ep. 21), Mama (ep 11-12), Matsu (Ep. 38 flashback)
Glass Mask as Keiko Ninomiya
Grandpa Danger as Sonny
Great Pretender as Miki Edamura
Gunparade Orchestra as Miki Kinjou
Hayate the Combat Butler as Female student (ep 29)
Hell Girl as Employee (ep 5)
Hitohira as Sachie Ayase
Honey and Clover II as Daughter (ep 12)
Innocent Venus as Akira (Ep. 8)
Hanasaku Iroha as Takako Kawajiri
Jigoku Shōjo Futakomori as Mami Kuriyama (ep 8)
Jormungand as Mildo
Karin as Female Student C (ep 7)
Kirakira PreCure a la Mode as Solène
Kirarin Revolution as Tina Garland (ep 32)
Kyo Kara Maoh! as Young Conrad, Young Stoffel
La Corda D'Oro ~primo passo~ as Young Tsuchiura (ep. 4)
Major as Hasegawa
Rockman.EXE Axess as Kousuke
Mobile Suit Gundam 00 as Marina Ismail
Mobile Suit Gundam AGE as Marina Asuno, Romy Ezelcant
Naruto as Hokuto
Nishi no Yoki Majo - Astraea Testament as Vincent Clemencia Daquitaine
Onegai My Melody as Mr. Crab (ep 1)
Pumpkin Scissors as Mother (ep 6)
Re:Creators as Aki Kikuchihara
SD Gundam Sangokuden Brave Battle Warriors as Chou-sen Qubeley
Sengoku Collection as Date Masamune (ep 4, 15, 22)
Sirius the Jaeger as Sachi
Tona-Gura! as Niina's mother (ep 4)
Tsubasa: RESERVoir CHRoNiCLE as Secret Agents (ep 9)
Utawarerumono as Younger sister (ep 14)
Wangan Midnight as Yoko Ota (ep 21)
Wizard Barristers: Benmashi Cecil as Ageha Chōno
Zoids: Fuzors as Matt; Chao

Original video animation
 Mobile Suit Gundam: The Origin (Astraia Tor Deikun)

Anime films
Mobile Suit Gundam 00 the Movie: A Wakening of the Trailblazer (Marina Ismail)

Video games
Astral Chain (Alicia Lopez)
Azure Striker Gunvolt 2 (Nori)
Bleach: Brave Souls (Kirio Hikifune)
Bravely Second (Magnolia Arch)
CR Virtua Fighter (Sarah Bryant, Vanessa Lewis)
League of Legends (Kayle)
Super Robot Wars UX (Chousen Qubeley)

Live-action
Death Note (Rem)
Yell (Actress)

Tokusatsu
Uchu Sentai Kyuranger as Echidna (Actor by Taiki Yamazaki) (ep 28, 31)

Dubbing

Live-action
The Age of Adaline (Adaline (Blake Lively))
Ant-Man and the Wasp (Catherine (Riann Steele))
Blade Runner 2049 (Dr. Ana Steline (Carla Juri))
Chicken with Plums (Irâne (Golshifteh Farahani))
The Connection (Jacqueline Michel (Céline Sallette))
The Correspondence (Victoria (Shauna Macdonald))
Cosmopolis (Elise Packer (Sarah Gadon))
Criminal (Jillian Pope (Gal Gadot))
Cruella (Catherine Miller (Emily Beecham))
Don't Worry Darling (Shelley (Gemma Chan))
Eternals (Sersi (Gemma Chan))
Far from the Madding Crowd (Bathsheba Everdene (Carey Mulligan))
Ford v Ferrari (Mollie Miles (Caitriona Balfe))
In Bruges (Chloe Villette (Clémence Poésy))
Inception (2012 TV Asahi edition) (Woman (Talulah Riley))
Ip Man series until The Finale (Cheung Wing-sing (Lynn Hung))
Knock Knock (Bel (Ana de Armas))
Kristy (Justine Wills (Haley Bennett))
Law Abiding Citizen (Sarah Lowell (Leslie Bibb))
Mindscape (Judith Morrow (Indira Varma))
Money Monster (Diane Lester (Caitriona Balfe))
My Fake Fiancé (Courtney (Nicole Tubiola))
The Nutcracker and the Four Realms (Queen Marie Stahlbaum (Anna Madeley))
Outlander (Claire Beauchamp Randall/Fraser (Caitriona Balfe))
Parasite (2021 NTV edition) (Choi Yeon-gyo (Cho Yeo-jeong))
Rabbit Hole (Izzy (Tammy Blanchard))
Saint Ralph (Claire Collins (Tamara Hope))
Scandal (Abby Whelan (Darby Stanchfield))
Side Effects (Deirdre Banks (Vinessa Shaw))
Skiptrace (Samantha Bai (Fan Bingbing))
Tomorrowland (History Teacher (Xantha Radley))
Wild Things: Foursome (Rachel Thomas (Marnette Patterson))
The Witches (Mrs. Jenkins (Morgana Robinson))

Animation
Batman: The Brave and the Bold (Talia al Ghul)
Coco (Mamá Luisa Rivera)
Rio (Jewel)
Rio 2 (Jewel)
Teen Titans (Kole)

References

External links
 
 Ayumi Tsunematsu @ 81produce

1981 births
81 Produce voice actors
Living people
Voice actresses from Hyōgo Prefecture
Japanese video game actresses
Japanese voice actresses
21st-century Japanese actresses